Ofeq-10, also known as Ofek-10 (Horizon in Hebrew), is part of the Ofeq family of reconnaissance satellites designed and built by Israel Aerospace Industries (IAI) for the Israeli Ministry of Defense.

Satellite description 
Ofek-10 is an upgraded variant of Ofeq-8, which employs a high-resolution synthetic-aperture radar (SAR) that is capable of observation at night and through clouds. The satellite's price was US$300 million. The satellite weighs 400 kg.

Launch 
Ofeq-10 was launched on 9 April 2014, at 19:06:02 UTC from the Palmachim Airbase in Israel, four years after Ofeq-9's launch. It was delivered using a Shavit launcher. Ofeq-10 was launched westward in a retrograde orbit.

References 

Reconnaissance satellites of Israel
Space synthetic aperture radar
2014 in Israel
Spacecraft launched by Shavit rockets
Spacecraft launched in 2014